Fairbury is the name of two places in the United States:

 Fairbury, Illinois
 Fairbury, Nebraska